Stephen Lobo (born 22 November 1973) is a Canadian actor, best known for his roles in the television series Arctic Air, Godiva's, Painkiller Jane, Falcon Beach, Little Mosque on the Prairie and Continuum. In 2011, he appeared in Mike Clattenburg's film Afghan Luke.

Early life
Stephen Lobo was born in Toronto, Ontario in 1973. His father, who emigrated to Canada from Tanga, Tanzania, was of Goan Indian descent, while his mother, who is of Iranian descent, is a nurse. Lobo attended the University of Toronto where he studied environmental science. At age 27, he began taking acting classes and moved to London where he earned a three-year degree in drama at Drama Centre London. He appeared in several plays while in England, including The Seagull and Paradise Lost.

Acting career
After doing theatre for several years in both Canada and the United Kingdom, Lobo first came to attention to television audiences as the star of the Canadian drama series Godiva's about a talented chef trying to succeed in the restaurant business. He later landed a leading role in the science fiction series Painkiller Jane (2007) playing a scientist and had a recurring role as an engineer in the second and third series of Little Mosque on the Prairie. He played the role of Indian pilot Dev Panwar in the series Arctic Air until it was cancelled in 2014. He starred in the science fiction series Continuum as time-traveling con man Matthew Kellog. In October 2019, Lobo was cast as Jim Corrigan in the Arrowverse crossover "Crisis on Infinite Earths".

Personal life
Lobo is married to actress Sonja Bennett. The couple has two children.

Filmography

Film

Television

Awards and nominations

References

External links

1973 births
Canadian male television actors
Male actors from Toronto
Living people
British male television actors